Dorel Ioan Zegrean (born 4 December 1969, in Mărișelu) is a former Romanian footballer who played as a defender, whose teams included Gloria Bistriţa, Fortuna Sittard, Naţional București, and BFC Dynamo.

Honours
Gloria Bistriţa
Cupa României: 1993–94

References

External links
Profile at RomanianSoccer.ro 
Profile at beijen.net 
Profile at Spox.com 

1969 births
Living people
People from Bistrița-Năsăud County
Romanian footballers
Association football fullbacks
Romania international footballers
ACF Gloria Bistrița players
FC Progresul București players
Fortuna Sittard players
Berliner FC Dynamo players
Liga I players
Eredivisie players
Expatriate footballers in the Netherlands
Romanian expatriate sportspeople in the Netherlands
Romanian expatriate footballers
Association football defenders